Simo Rinne (2 August 1941 – 28 September 2015) was a Finnish speed skater. He competed in the men's 500 metres at the 1964 Winter Olympics.

References

1941 births
2015 deaths
Finnish male speed skaters
Olympic speed skaters of Finland
Speed skaters at the 1964 Winter Olympics
Sportspeople from Tampere